Stephen Harrison (born 1957), is a male former swimmer who competed for England.

Swimming career
Harrison represented England in the 100 metres and 200 metres backstroke events, at the 1978 Commonwealth Games in Edmonton, Alberta, Canada. Four years later he represented England and won a silver medal in the 4 x 100 metres medley relay, in addition to competing in the backstroke events, at the 1982 Commonwealth Games in Brisbane, Queensland, Australia.

He won the 1982 ASA National Championship title in the 100 metres backstroke.

Coaching career
After retiring from competitive swimming he became a coach for the Romsey and Totton Swimming Club.

References

1957 births
English male swimmers
Commonwealth Games medallists in swimming
Commonwealth Games silver medallists for England
Swimmers at the 1978 Commonwealth Games
Swimmers at the 1982 Commonwealth Games
Living people
Medallists at the 1982 Commonwealth Games